Tolvaptan phosphate is a drug used for the treatment of cardiac edema.  It is a prodrug of tolvaptan, formulated as the salt tolvaptan sodium phosphate, for intravenous administration.  Tolvaptan phosphate is converted into the active drug tolvaptan in the human body following administration.

It was developed by Otsuka Pharmaceutical Co. and was approved for use in Japan in 2022.

References 

Prodrugs
Organophosphates
Diuretics
Chloroarenes
Benzanilides
Vasopressin receptor antagonists
Benzazepanes